Marc Kamionkowski (born 1965) is an American theoretical physicist and currently the William R. Kenan, Jr. Professor of Physics and Astronomy at Johns Hopkins University. His research interests include particle physics, dark matter, inflation, the cosmic microwave background and gravitational waves.

Career
Kamionkowski received a BA degree in 1987 from Washington University in St. Louis and a PhD in 1991 from the University of Chicago.  He did postdoctoral study at the Institute for Advanced Study and joined the faculty of Columbia University in 1994 as an assistant professor of physics. From 1999 to 2006, Kamionkowski was a professor at The California Institute of Technology, and from 2006 to 2011 the Robinson Professor of Theoretical Physics and Astrophysics. He joined the faculty at Johns Hopkins as professor in 2011.
 
He is known primarily for work on supersymmetric dark matter and the cosmic microwave background.  He was awarded the US Department of Energy's 2006 E. O. Lawrence Award in High Energy and Nuclear Physics for "his theoretical analyses demonstrating that precise observations of the cosmic microwave background can lead to deep understanding of the origin and evolution of the Universe, thereby motivating a series of increasingly precise cosmological experiments".

Academic positions

2016Present: William R. Kenan, Jr. Professor, Department of Physics and Astronomy, Johns Hopkins University.
20112015: Professor of Physics and Astronomy, Johns Hopkins University.
2010 Fall: Miller Visiting Research Professor, Department of Physics, University of California, Berkeley.
20062012: Robinson Professor of Theoretical Physics and Astrophysics, California Institute of Technology.
20062011: Founding Director, Moore Center for Theoretical Cosmology and Physics, California Institute or Technology.
19962007: Professor of Theoretical Physics and Astrophysics, California Institute of Technology
19981999: Associate Professor, Department of Physics, Columbia University.
19941998: Assistant Professor, Department of Physics, Columbia University.

Awards and fellowships
National Merit Scholar (1983-1987)
Phi Beta Kappa (1986)
NASA GSRP Fellow (1989)
SSC National Fellowship (1991)
Alfred P. Sloan Research Fellowship (1996)
DoE Outstanding Junior Investigator Award (1998)
Helen B. Warner Prize (1998)
E. O. Lawrence Award (2006)
American Physical Society Fellowship (2008)
American Academy of Arts and Sciences (2013)
Simons Investigator (2014)
Dannie Heineman Prize for Astrophysics (2015)
International Society on General Relativity and Gravitation Fellowship (2016)
Fellow of the American Association for the Advancement of Science (2017)
National Academy of Sciences (2019)
Fellow of the American Astronomical Society (2020)
 Gruber Prize in Cosmology (2021), jointly with Uroš Seljak and Matias Zaldarriaga

References

External links
Home page
Papers at arXiv.org (physics preprint server)

The Kathleen Dunn Show - Wisconsin Radio

21st-century American physicists
Cosmic gravitational wave background
1965 births
Living people
American people of Polish descent
Washington University in St. Louis alumni
Washington University physicists
University of Chicago alumni
Johns Hopkins University faculty
Simons Investigator
Members of the United States National Academy of Sciences
Fellows of the American Physical Society
Fellows of the American Academy of Arts and Sciences
Fellows of the American Association for the Advancement of Science
Fellows of the American Astronomical Society
Winners of the Dannie Heineman Prize for Astrophysics
American cosmologists